Norristown may mean:

 Norristown, Arkansas, an unincorporated community
 Norristown, Georgia, an unincorporated community
 Norristown, Indiana, an unincorporated community
 Norristown, Pennsylvania, a borough
 Norristown Transportation Center, a train station in Norristown 
 Other train stations in Norristown:
 Main Street station (SEPTA)
 Elm Street station
 Norristown, California, an ephemeral California Gold Rush settlement on the American River